Violeta Panayotova Gindeva (June 14, 1946 – April 21, 2019) was a Bulgarian actress.

Life
Gindeva was born in Sliven in 1946. She studied under Prof.  and Prof. Grisha Ostrovski at the Krastyo Sarafov National Academy for Theatre and Film Arts. She graduated in 1968.

In 1971, she was among leading actors who appeared in the controversial TV film Demonat na imperiyata "The Demon of the Empire". The film about national hero Vasil Levski had a daring "Western" style story, which was nearly dropped after protests of how it poked fun at the Turkish army.

Gindeva was sacked by Vasil Stefanov in 1993. She said this was because she objected to the policy of retiring elder actors. It was her view that actors of any age are always required.

After some difficult times as an actor, she turned to politics, and she was elected as the deputy mayor of Pazardzhik from 2003 to 2007. After about 20 years away from acting, she returned to acting at the Bulgarian National Theatre. She was cast in Rositsa Obreshkova's cast of the American comedy  play Lunatics by Ken Ludwig two year before she died in Sofia in 2019. In 2018 she had begun teaching at the University of Plovdiv assisting Michael Botevski.

Films
"Black Angels"
"The Adventures of Avakum Zakhov"
"The Daughter in Law", 1971
"The Demon of the Empire", 1971 (for TV)
"The Prince", 1970
"The Wedding of John Assen", 1975

References

External links

1946 births
2019 deaths
People from Sliven
Bulgarian actresses